Union School District 62 is a school district in Tolleson, Arizona located in Maricopa County, Arizona. Union E.S.D encompasses three schools. Union Elementary School is a Kindergarten to Second grade campus servicing families residing between 83rd Ave and 99th Ave, South of Lower Buckeye Rd. Hurley Ranch Elementary School is a Third grade to Eight grade campus servicing families residing between 83rd Ave and 99th Ave, South of Lower Buckeye Rd. Dos Rios Elementary School is a Kindergarten to Eight grade campus servicing families residing between 83rd Ave and 99th Ave, North of Lower Buckeye Rd and South of Buckeye Rd.

References

External links
 

School districts in Maricopa County, Arizona